Conduit Road is a road in the Mid-Levels on Hong Kong Island in Hong Kong.

The road and buildings

Conduit Road was constructed in 1910. It is located in Western Mid-Levels. It is named after the aqueduct passing underneath which carries water from the Pok Fu Lam Reservoir to the Central area. It is at the highest point on Victoria Peak reached by the Central–Mid-Levels escalators. It is also the second highest road; second to Po Shan Road; in Western Mid-Levels. The road was renamed as "Izumo-dori" (出雲通) during Japanese occupation of Hong Kong. After the surrender and evacuation of Japanese army, its name was changed back.

It is a luxury residential area. One of the road's earliest residents was Catchick Paul Chater, who built a magnificent residence at 1, Conduit Road named 'Marble Hall', whose gatehouse is the only reminder of this connection today. The road interchanges with Glenealy at the east-end with Hornsey Road intersecting next to the "slope section" near the east-end of the road.
Kotewall Road, Po Shan Road, and Hatton Road at the west-end. The east-end is often considered as the start of the road with the rest being sparsely populated with less traffic.

Because of its long history, the residence found along it are at times relatively older and lower-standard than the more recent properties, and those found on the relatively newly developed Central Mid-Levels area. An example of the larger "old" residential apartments is Realty Gardens (No. 41) (recently renovated). Other similarly old properties include Elegant Garden (No.11), Panorama (No.15), Cliffview Mansions (No. 17-19 & 21–25); Conway Mansion (No.29) ; Woodland Gardens (No.62A ~ F) ; and Manly Mansion (No.44,44A).

Other than Realty Gardens, all the other relatively old assets are concentrated very shallow into the road itself as proven by the almost-consecutive numbers. These properties are also all built on the northern side of the road, as shown by all the even numbers. The main reason for this is that there were no flat tough ground for foundations on the waterfront side (northern side) of the road 30–40 years ago, but only slopes of greenery. Furthermore, building them on the mountainside is easier and allows a more laid-back position with a better view of the Victoria Harbour. Thus the buildings standing along the eastern part and on the waterfront side of the road (northern side) were mostly built in recent times. They were built by removing sections of the mountain (so to add foundations) and/or extending the foundations from Robinson Road- the road one street-level lower. This is mostly the case for the near-eastern-end part of Conduit Road.

In the past, until the early 1990s; the views of the harbour were mostly uninterrupted for the any mid-rise mountainside properties lining the mountainside near the eastern end of the road. (they have had to be of lesser height as they are elevated by the slope; the height limit was also very low 30–40 years ago). However, in the early 1990s, new properties began to be constructed by extending foundations from Robinson Road. And since the building height requirements became much more loose with the buildings being 30–40 storeys high, the harbour views were no more.

Number 41A Conduit Road is a deeply secluded pre-war house blocked-from-view by Realty Gardens (No. 41) and is located on the hillside. Number 41, next door, had a wide history; not only did it feature as the original location of The Foreign Correspondents' Club but it was also the hospital in the 1955 film Love Is a Many-Splendored Thing. Number 2 also has proven history and citywide recognition: it is renowned for housing influential Hong Kong socialites.

Numbering

Numbers are odd on the mountainside of the road and even on the side closer to waterfront; which makes sense since the first properties were built along the mountainside (southern side) of the road.

The odd numbers starts at the busier eastern end of the road from the government estate Chater Hall Flats (No.1 Conduit Road) and ends at Skyline Mansion (No. 51 Conduit Road) near the western end of the road; while even numbers starts right across No.1, Yukon Court (No.2 Conduit Road) is its name, ran all the way through Kiu Sen Court (No.70 Conduit Road). Although there is currently a new residential building numbered 55 on the road which will technically forever be the last property on the road in terms of location (as the site is located on the last stretch of land on Conduit Road). 

Thus, the main reason for the particular direction of property-numbering was chiefly attributed by the fact that the first properties to have graced Conduit Road were all concentrated at the eastern end; which is understandable as that end is closer to the Central District than the western end giving it much higher accessibility and convenience, and as of 15 October 1993 serviced by The Central–Mid-Levels escalator and walkway system.

Lethal landslides

On 7 December 1911, a major landslip, caused by heavy rainfall, killed four people at a building site. This occurred during excavation and heavy rain.

On 18 June 1972, an even more devastating landslide occurred. It started from a redevelopment site on Conduit Road above Po Shan Road and slid down 270 meters to Kotewall Road crossing Conduit Road near number 53. Casualties were high with 67 people killed, 20 injured and 2 buildings totally destroyed. An estimated 40,000 cubic meters of earth and debris moved in this slip.

See also
List of streets and roads in Hong Kong
39 Conduit Road
Central–Mid-Levels escalators

References

External links

Google Maps of Conduit Road

Mid-Levels
Roads on Hong Kong Island